George "Rabbit" Shively (January 3, 1893 – June 7, 1962) was an American baseball left fielder in the Negro leagues. He played from 1910 to 1924 with various teams. He played mostly with the Indianapolis ABCs.

He was asked to leave the Indianapolis ABCs to Captain the "Lyon's Black Devils" baseball team of Kokomo, Indiana for part of the 1919 season, then later that year left for the East Coast where he appears to have played the rest of his career.

Shively died in 1962 and was buried in an unmarked grave in Bloomington, Indiana. A limestone monument was dedicated on his gravesite in the Rosehill Cemetery on April 4, 2015 in a community ceremony memorializing Shively and 10 other African Americans also buried in unmarked graves.

References

External links
 and Baseball-Reference Black Baseball stats and Seamheads

1893 births
1962 deaths
Indianapolis ABCs players
Bacharach Giants players
Brooklyn Royal Giants players
Washington Potomacs players
Baseball players from Kentucky
People from Lebanon, Kentucky
20th-century African-American sportspeople
Baseball outfielders